Birahgan (also Romanized as Bīrāhgān; also known as Birahkan, Bīr Āvgān, and Bīr Hangān) is a village in Miankuh-e Moguyi Rural District, in the Central District of Kuhrang County, Chaharmahal and Bakhtiari Province, Iran. At the 2006 census, its population was 195, in 37 families. 
Birahgan or Birgan means "the roadless land" in Persian, its name references the rough mountainous terrain in the region.  The village is populated by Bakhtiari Lurs.

References 

Populated places in Kuhrang County
Luri settlements in Chaharmahal and Bakhtiari Province